Padma Desai (born October 12, 1931) is an Indian-American development economist who was born and studied in India before completing a PhD at Harvard in 1960.  She is the Gladys and Roland Harriman Professor Emerita of comparative economic systems and has been the director of the Center for Transition Economies at the Columbia University.

She was awarded the Padma Bhushan by the Government of India in 2009.

Early life and education
Desai was born and brought up in a traditional Gujarati Anavil Brahmin family in Surat, Gujarat.

She did her B.A. (Economics) in 1951 from the University of Mumbai, followed by an M.A. (Economics) also from the same university in 1953. Thereafter she completed her Ph.D. from Harvard in 1960.

Career
Desai started her career at the Department of Economics, Harvard (1957-1959), after which she was associate professor of economics at Delhi School of Economics at University of Delhi, from 1959 to 1968.

In November 1992, she joined as the Gladys and Roland Harriman Professor of Comparative Economic Systems at Columbia University and went on to become the director of the Center for Transition Economies at the University.

She later was the U.S. Treasury’s advisor to the Russian Finance Ministry in the summer of 1995. She was president of the Association for Comparative Economic Studies in 2001.

She published her memoir, Breaking Out: An Indian Woman's American Journey in 2012.

Personal life
She is married to Jagdish Bhagwati, also an Indian-American economist and professor of economics and law at Columbia University; the couple have one daughter.

Bibliography
 Breaking Out: An Indian Woman's American Journey. Viking, 2012. .
 From Financial Crisis to Global Recovery. Harper Collins, 2012. .
 Conversations on Russia: Reform from Yeltsin to Putin. Oxford University Press, 2006. .
 Financial Crisis, Contagion, and Containment: From Asia to Argentina. Princeton University Press, 2003. .
 Work Without Wages: Russia's Non-Payment Crisis, with Todd Idson. MIT Press, 2001. .
 Going Global: Transition from Plan to Market in the World Economy, Editor. MIT Press, 1997. .
 The Soviet Economy: Problems and Prospects. Blackwell, 1990. 
 Perestroika in Perspective: The Design and Dilemmas of Soviet Reform. I B Tauris & Co, 1989. .
 Bokaro Steel Plant: A Study of Soviet Economic Assistance. North-Holland, 1972. .

References

 Celebrating Padma Desai Columbia University

External links
 Padma Desai, homepage at Columbia University
 

20th-century Indian economists
1931 births
Living people
American people of Gujarati descent
People from Surat
Indian emigrants to the United States
American economists
American memoirists
Indian development economists
University of Mumbai alumni
Harvard Graduate School of Arts and Sciences alumni
Russian studies scholars
Academic staff of Delhi University
Columbia University faculty
Recipients of the Padma Bhushan in literature & education
Indian women economists
American women memoirists
20th-century Indian women scientists
20th-century American women writers
Scientists from Gujarat
21st-century Indian economists
21st-century Indian women scientists
21st-century American women writers
American women economists
Women scientists from Gujarat
Educators from Gujarat
Women educators from Gujarat
20th-century Indian women writers
20th-century Indian writers
21st-century Indian women writers
21st-century Indian writers